Tenstar Community, often known simply as "TEN", is a Third Sector not-for-profit movemente and association established and registered in Italy, in the city of Verona.

"TEN" is committed to the social regeneration, focusing on education, culture and creativity by creating interactivity within TEN creative sectors which are  architecture, arts, cinematography, design, environmental engineering, photography, graphics, music, performing arts and urban regeneration.

"TEN" sustains artists and creative people through the ten disciplines basing on the creative economy and the green economy and by inviting and working with influential professionals of these sectors.

Background

The platform of Tenstar Community Movement was created in 2000 by Abbas Gharib with other professionals and artists both in Europe and Middle East to support the creative people and to defend their sectors, working through the possible comparative dialogues with the world of Western advanced, cultures and disciplines within targeted initiatives in arts and creativity. Its name at the origins, was  "Ten - International Developments", with the actions in the Post-contemporary domai for the ten creative areas to support young designers and artists.

In 2008, this Platform was transferred to Italy to become a Registered Italian association and to implement better its actions, in the European environments best suited to create a  container for its concepts and a network for its objectives believing that the Educational sectors, including public and private services are forming large parts of creative areas.

Mission and Vision

This Movement believes that its commitment for the social regeneration, by working within the interactions of its creative sectors is also a valid contribution for passing from an old energy-based, to a new knowledge based society. In these tasks, its vision through the creative concepts, leads to the overcoming of the current models in the field of artistic expression to the new creative formats, projected toward the future.  
The mission wants to see rebuilt, the legacy of artistic and cultural heritage of the city artifacts, which are meaningful as the best spatial places, capable of accommodating art and culture experiences, creation of employments with  value added sustainable production, for an advanced structural economy of culture and creativity for a post-industrial society, i.e. a knowledge society.

New organizers with new tasks

New organizers of "Tenstar Community" in Italy are Sandra Villa, an architect and designer, Samì Gharib, a sociologist and expert in communication and Leila Gharib who is a Musician and art performer.
The commitments of "TEN" coincide with the current economic and social needs of innovation, so that the ten creative areas and the ten goals of the Association remain being active in the educational, cultural and creative sectors, that are engines for the growth and development, claiming the "creative citizens' rights" for a knowledge society, a World Without Poverty.

Notes 
Events of Tenstar Community Movement  for Education, Culture and Creativity in TEN interactive sectors:

References

Further reading
 Charles Landry, The origins & futures of the creative city, Comedia .
 Richard Florida, The Great Reset: How the Post-Crash Economy Will Change the Way We Live and Work, HarperBusiness; Reprint edition 2011, .

External links
 
 Social Economy Network
 The Creative Economy

Arts organizations established in 2000
Cultural organisations based in Italy